The 2016 Men's EuroHockey Indoor Club Champions Cup was the 27th edition of the Men's EuroHockey Indoor Club Champions Cup, Europe's premier men's club indoor hockey tournament organized by the European Hockey Federation. It was held at Harvestehuder THC in Hamburg, Germany from 12 to 14 February 2016.

The hosts Harvestehude won its fourth title by defeating Arminen 2–1 in the final, Partille took the bronze medal and Slavia Prague and Luzerner SC were relegated to the Trophy division..

Results

Preliminary round

Pool A

Pool B

Fifth to eighth place classification

Pool C

First to fourth place classification

Semi-finals

Third place game

Final

Statistics

Final standings

Top goalscorers

See also
2015–16 Euro Hockey League

References

Men's EuroHockey Indoor Club Cup
Club Cup Men
International indoor hockey competitions hosted by Germany
EuroHockey Indoor Club Cup
Sports competitions in Hamburg
EuroHockey Indoor Club Cup Men
2010s in Hamburg